WTRL may refer to:

 WTRL-LP, a defunct low-power radio station (94.9 FM) formerly licensed to serve Vonore, Tennessee, United States
 Women's Tax Resistance League